Hoseyn Arbabi (also Romanized as Ḩoseyn Arbābī; also known as Deh-e Ḩoseyn Arbābī) is a village in Jahanabad Rural District, in the Central District of Hirmand County, Sistan and Baluchestan Province, Iran. At the 2006 census, its population was 125, in 28 families.

References 

Populated places in Hirmand County